The Headies 2012 was the 7th edition of The Headies (known as the Hip Hop World Awards until the 6th edition). It was hosted by M.I and Omawumi. The ceremony took place on 20 October 2012, at the Eko Hotel and Suites in Victoria Island, Lagos. The aforementioned hosts thrilled fans with their song titled "The Headies". Chidinma opened the show by performing her song "Kedike". The Okoye brothers (Peter, Paul, and Jude) won a total of three awards. The Artiste of the Year award went to Wizkid. Tiwa Savage and Wande Coal won the Best Male and Female Vocal Performance categories, respectively. Vector won the Best Rap Single and Lyricist on the Roll plaques for "Angeli". Davido won the Next Rated category and was later awarded a Hyundai Sonata. The Headies celebrated the reunion of prominent Nigerian musicians from the 80s and 90s, including Onyeka Onwenu, Oris Wiliki, Mike Okori, Baba Fryo, Shina Peters, Fatai Rolling Dollar and Daddy Showkey. Femi Kuti was honored with the Hall of Fame award.

Nomination and entries
Nigerian artists who wanted to be considered for nomination were told to submit three audio CDs, four DVDs, a mini DV tape, soft copies of their profile, and a portrait picture to the award’s secretariat. Submission of entries commenced on 4 June and ended on 30 June 2012. Music content released between March 2011 and February 2012 were eligible for entry.
    
P-Square and Bez received the most nominations with six each. Wizkid, Davido and Ice Prince were tied for second place with four each.

Activities

Veterans Night
The 2013 edition of Veterans Night, a black tie event that honors and celebrates Nigerian musicians of the past, was held at the Grand Ballroom of the Eko Hotel and Suites on 19 October 2012. Artists and personalities recognized that night include Caleb Olumese, Tony Okoroji, Daniel Wilson, Oritz Wiliki, Chris Okotie, Daddy Fresh, Stella Monye, Baba Fryo, Edi Lawani, Easy K, Pretty, Fellyx, Alex Zitto, Edmund Spice, Ras Kimono, Majek Fashek, Mandators, Edna Ogoli, Bongos Ike, Onyeka Onwenu, K1 De Ultimate, Mike Okra and Blackky.

Help the Children campaign
As part of its Corporate Social Responsibility philosophy, The Headies donated clothes and other materials to kids in need. The 2012 campaign helped children living in the Ajegunle and Makoko Riverine communities.

Performers

Winners and nominees

References

2012 music awards
2012 in Nigerian music
The Headies